Sigma Gamma Tau is the American honor society in Aerospace Engineering. It seeks to identify and recognize achievement and excellence in the Aerospace field within the United States. Sigma Gamma Tau's collegiate chapters elect annually to membership those students, alumni, and professionals who, by conscientious attention to their studies or professional duties, uphold this high standard for the betterment of their profession.

The objectives of Sigma Gamma Tau, as stated in the preamble of the society's national constitution, are: "to recognize and honor those individuals in the field of Aeronautics and Astronautics who have, through scholarship, integrity, and outstanding achievement, been a credit to their profession. The society seeks to foster a high standard of ethics and professional practice and create a spirit of loyalty and fellowship, particularly among students of Aerospace Engineering."

History
Sigma Gamma Tau was founded on the campus of Purdue University in West Lafayette, Indiana, on February 28, 1953, "to offer appropriate recognition to persons of superior scholarship, outstanding character, and professional achievement in the field of Aeronautical Engineering."

The new society was formed by the merger of two existing societies, Tau Omega, founded in 1927 at the University of Oklahoma, and Gamma Alpha Rho, founded in 1945 at Rensselaer Polytechnic Institute.

The name of the society was selected by combining the Greek letter Sigma, indicating sum, with Gamma and Tau from the initial letters of the parent organizations.

Chapters

Since its modest beginnings in 1953, the society has grown from 14 to 54 collegiate chapters and from 1,900 to 29,000+ initiated members in 9 regions:

Northeastern
 Boston University - Boston, MA
 University at Buffalo - Buffalo, NY (inactive)
 Clarkson University - Potsdam, NY
 Massachusetts Institute of Technology - Cambridge, MA (inactive)
 Rensselaer Polytechnic Institute - Troy, NY
 Southern New Hampshire University - Manchester, NH
 Syracuse University - Syracuse, NY
 Worcester Polytechnic Institute - Worcester, MA

Mid-Atlantic
 University of Maryland - College Park, MD
 Pennsylvania State University - University Park, PA
 University of Virginia - Charlottesville, VA
 Virginia Polytechnic Institute & State University - Blacksburg, VA
 West Virginia University - Morgantown, WV

Southeastern
 University of Central Florida - Orlando, FL
 Embry-Riddle Aeronautical University - Daytona Beach, FL
 University of Florida - Gainesville, FL
 Florida Institute of Technology - Melbourne, FL
 Georgia Institute of Technology - Atlanta, GA
 North Carolina State University - Raleigh, NC

South Central
 University of Alabama in Huntsville - Huntsville, AL
 University of Alabama - Tuscaloosa, AL
 Auburn University - Auburn, AL
 Mississippi State University - Starkville, MS
 University of Tennessee - Knoxville, TN
 Tuskegee University - Tuskegee, AL

Great Lakes
 Air Force Institute of Technology - Dayton, OH
 University of Cincinnati - Cincinnati, OH (inactive)
 University of Illinois - Urbana, IL
 Illinois Institute of Technology - Chicago, IL (inactive)
 University of Michigan - Ann Arbor, MI
 University of Notre Dame - Notre Dame, IN
 Ohio State University - Columbus, OH
 Purdue University - West Lafayette, IN
 Western Michigan University - Kalamazoo, MI

North Central
 United States Air Force Academy - Colorado Springs, CO
 University of Colorado - Boulder, CO
 Iowa State University - Ames, IA
 University of Kansas - Lawrence, KS
 University of Minnesota - Minneapolis, MN (inactive)
 Missouri University of Science & Technology - Rolla, MO
 St. Louis University - Cahokia, IL (inactive)
 Wichita State University - Wichita, KS

Southwestern
 New Mexico State University - Las Cruces, NM
 University of Oklahoma - Norman, OK
 Oklahoma State University - Stillwater, OK
 Texas A&M University - College Station, TX
 University of Texas at Arlington - Arlington, TX (inactive)
 University of Texas at Austin - Austin, TX

Western
 University of Arizona - Tucson, AZ (inactive)
 Arizona State University - Tempe, AZ (inactive)
 Embry-Riddle Aeronautical University - Prescott, AZ
 San Jose State University - San Jose, CA
 University of Washington - Seattle, WA

Southern Pacific
 University of California at Irvine - Irvine, CA
 California Polytechnic State University - San Luis Obispo - San Luis Obispo, CA
 California State Polytechnic University - Pomona - Pomona, CA
 California State University - Long Beach - Long Beach, CA
 San Diego State University - San Diego, CA
 University of Southern California - Los Angeles, CA

National leadership

National headquarters
The national headquarters of Sigma Gamma Tau is located at the Aerospace Engineering Department of Wichita State University.

National officers
 National President: Dr. Roy Myose, Wichita State University
 National Vice President: Dr. Mohammad Sadraey, Southern New Hampshire University 
 Immediate Past President: Dr. Animesh Chakravarthy , Wichita State University
 National Secretary/Treasurer: Dr. Roy Myose, Wichita State University

National convention
SGT National Convention has been held every three years since 1953 (except for the years between 1956 and 1964). The most recent convention was held in conjunction with the AIAA Aerospace Sciences Meeting at Orlando, Florida in January 2018.

External links
 National website for Sigma Gamma Tau

Student societies in the United States
Engineering honor societies
Student organizations established in 1953
1953 establishments in Indiana
Former members of Association of College Honor Societies